Building the Perfect Beast is the second solo studio album by American rock singer Don Henley, released on November 19, 1984 by Geffen Records. A commercial and critical success, it is generally regarded as the culmination of the smoother, more adult-oriented sound of Henley's solo work.

For the album, Henley collaborated primarily with guitarist Danny Kortchmar, along with members of the then line-up of Tom Petty and the Heartbreakers, who contributed to the writing of the songs: guitarist Mike Campbell, keyboardist Benmont Tench and drummer Stan Lynch, the last of whom would later collaborate with Henley in composing the Eagles' song "Learn to Be Still", which was released on their live album Hell Freezes Over (1994). The album also features contributions from Fleetwood Mac's guitarist, Lindsey Buckingham, the Go-Go's lead vocalist Belinda Carlisle, and features contributions from Randy Newman, Jim Keltner, Waddy Wachtel, Pino Palladino, Steve Porcaro, and Ian Wallace.

The album reached #13 on the Billboard 200 and was certified 3× Platinum by the Recording Industry Association of America (RIAA). The album spawned four singles which all reached the top forty on the Billboard Hot 100, including "The Boys of Summer", which would become one of Henley's most popular songs and win him numerous awards, including a Grammy Award and four MTV Video Music Awards.

In 1989, the album was ranked No. 73 on the Rolling Stone magazine's list of "The 100 Greatest Albums of the 1980s".

Critical reception
Reviewing the album in Rolling Stone, Kurt Loder wrote that "Building the Perfect Beast is a meticulously crafted and programmed set of songs about love and politics. The first side is given to personal reflections on love and loss, such as the wistful "Boys of Summer." Side two is more issue-oriented, tackling subjects from genetic engineering ("Building the Perfect Beast") to America's reckless foreign policy ("All She Wants to Do Is Dance"). The album's longest and most ambitious piece, "Sunset Grill," describes in disturbingly vivid images a character's sense of entrapment in an evil, convulsive metropolis: "You see a lot more meanness in the city/It's the kind that eats you up inside/Hard to come away with anything that feels like dignity."

Reviewing retrospectively for AllMusic, critic Vik Iyengar has written of the album, "After experimenting with synthesizers and a pop sound on his solo debut, Don Henley hits the mark on his sophomore release, Building the Perfect Beast. This album established Henley as an artist in his own right after many successful years with the Eagles, as it spawned numerous hits."

Release

Japanese reissue
The original mix of the album was reissued in Japan in a replica of the original compact disc artwork. The album was remastered, for this reissue using Direct Stream Digital (DSD) to transfer the digital files. The release was a limited edition in the SHM-CD format.

Track listing

Note: "A Month of Sundays" appeared on the cassette and compact disc versions of the album, but was not included on the LP format. On vinyl it was released as the B-side of the single "The Boys of Summer."

Personnel

Musicians

 Don Henley – lead vocals, harmony vocals (2, 5, 7, 11) drums (2-4, 7, 8), keyboards (5), percussion (5, 6, 10), synthesizers (6), chant voices (6), synthesizer arrangements (9)
 Danny Kortchmar – synthesizers (1, 3, 6), guitars (1-7, 9, 10, 11), horns (3), organ (4), Omnichord (4) percussion (6, 10, 11), chant voices (6), guitar synthesizer solo (9), horn solo (9), synthesizer arrangements (9), keyboards (10), bass (10), arrangements (11)
 Mike Campbell – synthesizers (1), guitars (1), percussion (1)
 Steve Porcaro – synthesizers (1, 4), programming (7)
 Benmont Tench – keyboards (2, 5), acoustic piano (8), synthesizers (9), synthesizer arrangements (9)
 David Paich – acoustic piano (4), synthesizers (7, 8), synthesizer arrangements (8), acoustic piano solo (9)
 Michael Boddicker – programming (6), sequencing (6), synthesizers (8, 9), E-mu Emulator (9), synthesizer arrangements (9)
 Albhy Galuten – Synclavier (6)
 Randy Newman – synthesizers (8), synthesizer arrangements (8, 9)
 Bill Cuomo – synthesizers (11), programming (11), percussion (11)
 Lindsey Buckingham – guitars (2), harmony vocals (2)
 Charlie Sexton – guitars (3)
 Larry Klein – bass (1)
 Pino Palladino – bass (2, 9, 11)
 Tim Drummond – bass (4, 5)
 Ian Wallace – drums (5)
 Kevin McCormick – African drums (6)
 Jim Keltner – additional drums (8)
 Maren Jensen – intro and interlude composer (8)
 Jerry Hey – horn arrangements (9)
 Belinda Carlisle – harmony vocals (3)
 Sam Moore – harmony vocals (4)
 Martha Davis – chant voices (6), harmony vocals (7)
 Michael O'Donahue – chant voices (6)
 Carla Olson – chant voices (6)
 Patty Smyth – chant voices (6), harmony vocals (6, 7, 9, 11)
 J. D. Souther – chant voices (6)
 Waddy Wachtel – chant voices (6)
 Marie-Pascale Elfman – the French Girls ensemble (10)
 Dominique Mancinelli – the French Girls ensemble (10)

Production
 Producers – Don Henley, Danny Kortchmar and Greg Ladanyi (all tracks); Mike Campbell (Track 1).
 Recorded and mixed by Niko Bolas and Greg Ladanyi
 Additional engineers – Niko Bolas, Richard Bosworth and Tom Knox.
 Assistant engineers – Richard Bosworth, Dan Garcia, David Schober and Duane Seykora.
 Horns on track 10 recorded by Allen Sides, assisted by Mark Ettel.
 Mastered by Mike Reese and Doug Sax at The Mastering Lab (Los Angeles, CA).
 Graphic coordinator – Jeri McManus
 Art direction – Don Henley, Maren Jensen and Jeri McManus.
 Photography – Herb Ritts

Charts

Weekly charts

Certifications

Awards
Grammy Awards

References

External links
 

Don Henley albums
1984 albums
Albums produced by Greg Ladanyi
Albums produced by Danny Kortchmar
Geffen Records albums